Jalizi-ye Bala (also Romanized as Jalīzī-ye Bālā; also known as Jalīzī) is a village in Nahr-e Anbar Rural District, Musian District, Dehloran County, Ilam Province, Iran. At the 2006 census, its population was 860, in 131 families. The village is populated by Arabs.

References 

Populated places in Dehloran County
Arab settlements in llam Province